NeuConnect is an HVDC submarine power cable under construction between England and Germany.

Project Status
As of December 2022, early construction works have started in Wilhelmhaven and Isle of Grain, and manufacture of the cable has started. The main construction phase will start in 2023. 

As of October 2022, operation is expected to start in 2028.

Route
The cable will run between a new substation on the Isle of Grain, in Kent in England to the Fedderwarden substation in Wilhelmshaven in the Lower Saxony region of Germany. Landfall will be next to Grain Coastal Park, in Kent, and at Hooksiel, near Wilhemshaven in Germany.

At 725km in length, the interconnector will be one of the longest in the world.

Specification
The DC element will operate at 525kV, with a maximum capacity of 1,400MW.

Economics
The project is privately financed and will cost £2.4Bn (€2.8Bn). The project will deliver £1.7Bn in consumer benefits to UK consumers over 25 years, and could deliver a net reduction in carbon emissions of over 13MtCO2 in the same time.

History
Neuconnect Britain Ltd. was established in 2018.

NeuConnect received Interim Project Approval from Ofgem in January 2018.

Public consultation events were held in July 2019.

In December 2019, the planning application was submitted to Medway District Council.

In December 2019, Invitations to Tender were launched for the procurement of two converter stations and 720km of HVDC cabling.

In December 2019, the Invitation to Tender (ITT) stage was launched to procure two converter stations and 720km of HVDC cables.

In January 2020, the Federal Network Agency in Germany (BNetzA) confirmed the NeuConnect interconnector project in its 2019-2030 grid development plan.

In April 2020, Neuconnect completed site survey work on the Isle of Grain.

A €1.2 billion cable contract was awarded in February 2022,

and substations contract in April.

In July 2022, the project reached financial close, allowing early construction works to begin later in 2022. 

In October 2022, the cable manufacturer Prysmian started production of the 725km cable.

See also
Icelink
North Sea Link
Nemo Link
NordLink
BritNed

References

External links
 Company website
 Public consultation leaflet

Electrical interconnectors to and from Great Britain
Electrical interconnectors to and from the Synchronous Grid of Continental Europe
HVDC transmission lines